The Lanark County Buildings, also referred to as the South Lanarkshire Council Headquarters, is a local government facility in Hamilton, Scotland.

History
Originally the headquarters of Lanark County Council (which had previously been based at Lanarkshire House in Ingram Street in Glasgow), between 1975 and 1996 it served the same function for the Strathclyde region's Lanark sub-region (which oversaw five smaller districts, including one for the Hamilton area based at the nearby Townhouse) then for the South Lanarkshire local authority since then.

Construction of the structure, which was undertaken by Laing Group to a design by the Lanarkshire County Architect, David Gordon Bannerman, in the International (Modernist) style, started in 1959; completed in 1964 with a ceremonial opening by the Queen Mother, the complex features a 17-storey  office block, a separate debating chamber in a rotunda and an external plaza with fountains. Category A listed, the modernist design was influenced by the United Nations building in New York City. Glass curtain walls cover the north and south facades, with the narrow east and west sides being blank white walls.

Occupying a prominent position where the A72 and A724 roads meet within the Hamilton West district north of the town's historic centre, its upper floors offer views over the M74 motorway, much of Lanarkshire and parts of Greater Glasgow, and in turn it is the area's tallest building (slightly higher than the numerous residential tower blocks in nearby Motherwell, although some of those have more floors) and one of its most recognisable features. Immediately to the east is the neo-classical Hamilton Sheriff Court building, also Category A listed.

See also
DoCoMoMo Key Scottish Monuments
List of Category A listed buildings in South Lanarkshire
List of listed buildings in Hamilton, South Lanarkshire
List of post-war Category A listed buildings in Scotland 
Prospect 100 best modern Scottish buildings

References

External links

Government buildings completed in 1964
1964 establishments in Scotland
Buildings and structures in Hamilton, South Lanarkshire
International style architecture in Scotland
Category A listed buildings in South Lanarkshire
Listed government buildings in Scotland
County halls in Scotland